Buena Vista High School is the name of several educational institutions, including:

Buena Vista High School in Chino, California
Buena Vista High School in Geyserville, California
Buena Vista High School in Lakewood, California
Buena Vista High School (Colorado) in Buena Vista, Colorado
Buena Vista High School in Saginaw, Michigan
Buena High School (Arizona) in Sierra Vista, Arizona.